Mehmoodpura is a village located in the Ludhiana West tehsil, of Ludhiana district, Punjab. It is situated on Dugri-Dhandra road. Gurudwara Alamghir sahib is about 5 km from the village. Baba sahib Singh Bedi is one of the major religious place in village. S. Bhan Singh of 47-Sikh regiment martyred in WW1 and his name is engraved on India Gate, New Delhi. His Memorial is also in Neuve-Chapelle Memorial in France. The village is one of 52 villages of Grewal clan. Major occupation of the villagers is related to agriculture. The total population is about 700. Gill railway station is about 1.5 km from village. The Nri’s of village has a lot of contribution in the development works of the village. 97% villagers practice sikhism. The nearby villages to Mehmoodpura are Dhandra, Manakwal, Gill, Kheri, Thakarwal, Alamghir Sahib, Dugri, Phullanwal.

Administration
The village is administrated by a Sarpanch who is an elected representative of village as per constitution of India and Panchayati raj (India).

Villages in Ludhiana West Tehsil

Air travel connectivity 
The closest airport to the village is Sahnewal Airport.

References

External links
  Villages in Ludhiana West Tehsil

Villages in Ludhiana West tehsil